Thomas Bourke may refer to:

 Thomas Bourke (1815–1875), Irish cricketer
 Thomas E. Bourke (1896–1978), United States Marine Corps general
 Thomas Bourke, 4th Baron Bourke of Connell (died 1599), Irish noble
 Tom Bourke (1918–2001), Australian rugby league footballer